Altvater is a surname of German origin. Notable people with the surname include:

Catherine Tharp Altvater (1907–1984), American painter
Elmar Altvater (1938–2018), German political scientist
Heinrich Altvater (1902–1994), German footballer
Wilhelm Altvater (1920–2001), German politician

See also
Altvater, German name for Praděd, mountain in the Czech Republic
Gessler (company)

References

Surnames of German origin